Heteromyia fasciata is a species of biting midges in the family Ceratopogonidae from North America.

References

Further reading

 
 

Ceratopogonidae
Articles created by Qbugbot
Insects described in 1825
Taxa named by Thomas Say
Diptera of North America